FK Bair Krkardaš is a football club based in the city of Bitola, North Macedonia. They were recently played in the Macedonian Third League.

History
The club was founded in 1992.

References

External links
Club info at MacedonianFootball 
Football Federation of Macedonia 

Bair Krkardaš
Association football clubs established in 1992
1992 establishments in the Republic of Macedonia